Proud is a 2004 film directed by Mary Pat Kelly and stars veteran actor and activist Ossie Davis, in his final film performance.  The motion picture was filmed in Elmira NY and Buffalo, NY.  The screenplay was written by Kelly based on her non-fiction book Proudly We Served (1999).

Proud was an Official Selection of The Third Annual Buffalo International Film Festival in 2009. Mary Pat Kelly and Lorenzo Dufau (last surviving crew member) introduced the screening.

Premise 
The film focuses on the meritorious service of the USS Mason (DE-529) of World War II, the first US Navy ship with a predominantly African American crew, and how three of the men were finally honored in January 1994 for their meritorious service.

Cast 
 Reggie Austin as Dubois
 Vernel Bagneris as Larry's Father
 Marcus Chait as Lieutenant Westin
 Michael Ciesla as Yeoman Of The Flagship
 Ossie Davis as Lorenzo DuFau
 Eric LaRay Harvey as Kevin / James Graham
 Rashad Haughton as Hank Fields
 Janet Hubert as Larry's Mother
 Albert Jones as Larry / Young Lorenzo DuFau
 Kidada Jones as Gordon's sister
 Jeffrey Nash as Marcus / Gordon Buchanan
 Denise Nicholas as Gordon's Mother
 Edward O'Blenis as Watkins
 Aidan Quinn as Commodore Alfred Lind
 Stephen Rea as Barney Garvey
 Darnell Williams as Thomas Young, War Correspondent

Reception

Critical response 
When the film was released Ronnie Scheib, film critic at Variety magazine, gave the film a mixed review, writing, "A weird hodgepodge, Proud is part history lesson, part family saga, a lyrical nod to the Old Sod, a Navy recruitment flag-waver and a war actioner. Earnest, intermittently rousing pic, skedded for a fall opening, should coast on Davis' masterful performance before being archived by cable for suitable occasions...Pic's overall structure is determined both by Davis' narration and by the presence of black war correspondent Thomas Young (Darnell Williams), who was assigned to cover the Mason. His frequent to-the-camera interviews with sailors abstractly punctuate the film, creating a broader sociological framework...Aside from generally excellent combat scenes, pic is uneven. The bigoted animosity of a petty officer, for instance, or the Admiral's dismissal of the captain's praise of his crew's valor as exaggeration unfold with the leaden sententiousness of a grade-school pageant."

Critic Marcia Davis with The Washington Post wrote, "The high purpose of Proud is not matched by the film's execution, however. It's worth seeing, but don't go expecting a traditional Hollywood feature film. It is rather oddly executed and uneven, unlike the well-known and controversial Glory, which won Denzel Washington his first Oscar, or the brilliant A Soldier's Story, adapted from Charles Fuller's A Soldier's Play. Proud is something of a hybrid, part documentary -- with actual footage from the Mason -- and part dramatization. It is at times deeply poignant when it talks about the longing of black men to be treated as men and what they went through to prove their worthiness. It can also be a bit of an unrestrained flag-waver on black American patriotism."

Accolades 
Nominated
 Black Reel Awards: Best Independent Film, Mary Pat Kelly; 2006.

Distribution 
Film festivals
 High Falls Film Festivals: November 11, 2004, Rochester, New York.
 Tribeca Film Festival: April 23, 2005, New York, New York.
 Lake Placid Film Festival: Lake Placid, New York.
 Urbanworld Film Festival:  New York, New York.
 Buffalo International Film Festival: Buffalo, New York

References

External links 
 
 
 

2004 films
2004 drama films
2000s war drama films
American war drama films
Films about race and ethnicity
Films set in the 1940s
World War II films based on actual events
American World War II films
2000s English-language films
2000s American films